Richmond High School is a public high school in Richmond, Indiana, United States. It is the home of the Richmond Red Devils, who are members of the North Central Conference of the Indiana High School Athletic Association (IHSAA). Prior to 1939, the school was known as Morton High School in honor of Indiana's Civil War Governor, Oliver P. Morton. The current principal of Richmond High is Rae Woolpy.

Facilities

Built in 1939-1941, the Colonial revival-style school originally consisted of an academic building called Morton Hall, a gymnasium called Civic Hall, and McGuire Hall, which houses the Richmond Art Museum. After outgrowing the Civic Hall gymnasium, the Tiernan Center was built as the home to boys' and girls' basketball, volleyball, and wrestling. The old Civic Hall gymnasium was converted into the Civic Hall Performing Arts Center, an auditorium which seats 924 and is home to the Richmond Symphony Orchestra in addition to other school and civic performing arts events. The current building consists of 500,000 square feet for instruction and student support services.

It was listed on the National Register of Historic Places in 2015.

Academics 
Students can take AP courses in Biology, Calculus, Chemistry, English Language (composition), English Literature, Environmental Science, Government, US History, Physics, and Statistics.  Additionally, students can undertake dual-credit coursework to earn college credit while attending the high school. Current dual-credit options are available through Earlham College, Indiana University East, Indiana University, and Ivy Tech Community College.

Athletics
RHS offers numerous sports for student athletes. This includes baseball (boys'), basketball, cross-country, football, golf, gymnastics (girls'), soccer, softball (girls'), tennis, volleyball (girls'), and wrestling.  A bowling team for both boys and girls competes on the club level.

Notable alumni

 Timmy Brown, former NFL running back and actor
 John Wilbur Chapman, evangelist
 Vice Admiral Terry Cross, Vice Commandant, United States Coast Guard
 Nathan Davis, former NFL player
 George Duning, Oscar-nominated composer
 Jack Everly, pops conductor, Indianapolis Symphony Orchestra
 Weeb Ewbank (Class of 1924), coach of the 1958 and 1959 NFL champion Baltimore Colts and the Super Bowl III champion New York Jets
 Vagas Ferguson, football player
 Paul Flatley, former NFL Rookie-of-the-Year (Minnesota Vikings)
 Norman Foster, actor, director
 Mary Haas, linguist
 Jeff Hamilton, jazz drummer
 Micajah C. Henley, roller skate maker
 William Holder, writer, author 
 Baby Huey, popular music artist
 Charles A. Hufnagel, artificial heart valve inventor
 Dominic James, basketball player at Marquette University, 2006 Big East Rookie of the Year
 C. Francis Jenkins, television pioneer
 Jim Jones, founder-leader of Peoples Temple
 Melvyn "Deacon" Jones, blues organist
 Harry Keenan actor
 Esther Kellner, author
 Jim Logan, football player
 Johnny Logan, professional basketball player
 Lamar Lundy, football player, one of the L.A. Rams Fearsome Foursome
 Kenneth MacDonald, actor
 Dick Murley, former NFL player
 Daniel G. Reid, industrialist and philanthropist
 "Singin' Sam", born Harry Frankel, radio star, minstrel
 Wendell Stanley, Nobel Prize winner
 Mel Thompson, college basketball player and coach
 Bo Van Pelt, professional golfer
 Burton J. Westcott, automobile manufacturer
 Gaar Williams, cartoonist
 Billy Wright, college basketball coach
 Wilbur Wright, aviation pioneer

 Jennifer Niven, Author "All The Bright Places"

See also
 List of high schools in Indiana

References

External links
RHS official website

School buildings on the National Register of Historic Places in Indiana
School buildings completed in 1941
Colonial Revival architecture in Indiana
Public high schools in Indiana
Schools in Wayne County, Indiana
Buildings and structures in Richmond, Indiana
National Register of Historic Places in Wayne County, Indiana
Education in Richmond, Indiana
1941 establishments in Indiana